Consuelo Bailey (née Northrop; October 19, 1899 – September 9, 1976) was an American lawyer, politician, and elected official.  She was the first woman to serve as Speaker of the Vermont House of Representatives and as the 66th lieutenant governor of Vermont.

Background and earlier career
Consuelo Bentina Northrop Bailey was born in Fairfield, Vermont on October 19, 1899, a daughter of Katherine E. (Fletcher) Northrop and Peter Bent Brigham Northrop.  Peter Northrop studied at Columbia Law School but decided on a farming career.  His venture proved successful, and grew to include a successful dairy farm, creamery, and maple sugar works.  An active Republican, he served in town offices and as a member of the Vermont House of Representatives.

Consuelo Bailey was raised in Fairfield and attended elementary school in Sheldon and high school in St. Albans.  She graduated from the University of Vermont with a Bachelor of Philosophy degree in 1921.  While attending college, she was admitted to the Phi Beta Kappa academic honor society.  Bailey taught school in Shelburne for a year, then decided on a legal career.

Bailey attended Boston University School of Law, from which she received her LL.B. degree in 1925.  In law school, she was captain of the debating team and served on the editorial staff of The Brief, the school's professional journal.  She was admitted to the Vermont Bar in 1925.

She served as Burlington's Grand Juror, the prosecutor in the city court, and in 1926, Bailey became the first woman to be admitted to practice before the Vermont Supreme Court and ran for State's Attorney of Chittenden County. Bailey was then elected to the Vermont Senate in 1930, and served one term.  She served as secretary to US Senator Ernest Willard Gibson before returning to Vermont to resume practicing law.

In 1950, Bailey was elected to the Vermont House of Representatives. She served as Speaker of the House from 1953 to 1955, the first woman Speaker of the Vermont House.

Lieutenant governor of Vermont

In 1954 she was elected the first female lieutenant governor of any state in U.S. history, serving as the 65th Lieutenant Governor of Vermont between 1955 and 1957.

Later roles
Bailey represented Vermont on the Republican National Committee from 1936 to 1976. She was vice chair from 1953 to 1957, and secretary from 1965 to 1973.  As secretary, she was responsible for calling the roll of delegates as they voted for president at the 1968 and 1972 Republican National Conventions.

Death and burial
Bailey died in Burlington on September 9, 1976.  She was buried at Sheldon Cemetery in Sheldon.

Family
In 1940, Bailey married her husband Henry A. Bailey (1893-1961), an attorney who served in both chambers of the state legislature and as mayor of Winooski.

See also
List of female lieutenant governors in the United States
List of female speakers of legislatures in the United States

References

External links
Biographical article on Consuelo Bailey
Biographical information on Consuelo Bailey from Women's Legal History (Stanford University)
Fletcher Family subseries of the Consuelo Northrop Bailey papers, Center for Digital Initiatives, University of Vermont Library
Consuelo Northrup Bailey digital exhibit from UVM
 Consuelo Northrop Bailey on Vermont Historical Society

1899 births
1976 deaths
Boston University School of Law alumni
Republican Party members of the Vermont House of Representatives
Women state legislators in Vermont
Lieutenant Governors of Vermont
Speakers of the Vermont House of Representatives
Vermont lawyers
20th-century American politicians
20th-century American women politicians
20th-century American lawyers